Ibrahim Suleiman Adnan Adam Harun is a citizen of Niger who was convicted for his role in the death of two US soldiers, in 2003.

Early life in Saudi Arabia

Although he is routinely listed as a citizen of Niger Harun was born and raised in Saudi Arabia.
It was in Saudi Arabia that he formed his support for jihadism, and from where he is reported to have left to undertake military training at a training camp in Afghanistan.  He is reported to have arrived in Afghanistan shortly before al Qaeda's attack on 9-11.

2003 firefight

Harun was said to have been part of a force that ambushed a group of American soldiers that included Jerod Dennis and Ray Losano, and wounded three other men.  Harun was said to have been wounded, during the attack, but was able to escape to Pakistan.

Contact with al Qaeda leaders

Harun met with Abu Faraj al-Libi and Abdul Hadi al-Iraqi – two senior al Qaeda leaders. It was at this point that he joined al Qaeda and swore an oath – bayat – to obey Osama bin Laden.  They delegated him to travel to Nigeria to lead an attack on the United States Embassy in Abuja.

The DOJ describes Harun fleeing Nigeria when one of his contacts was apprehended, and he believed the plot's secrecy was compromised.  They assert he fled to Libya, from where he planned to travel to Europe.  Libyan security officials however arrested Harun first, in 2005, and held him until June 2011, when the Muammar Gadafi regime was overthrown.

Harun fled Libya immediately for Italy, where he was arrested on June 24, 2011.
 
According to Tom Hays, reporting for the Associated Press, Harun then traveled to Africa, where he had some involvement in a plot to bomb a US embassy.  He was, however, imprisoned in Libya, by Muammar Gadafi's government, from 2005 until 2011.

Harun was first tied to the deaths of the American soldiers when a copy of the Koran a surviving GI found on the battlefield, and kept, as a souvenir, was found to contain Harun's fingerprints.

Legal battle

Tom Hays, of the Associated Press, reported that Harun confessed to playing a role in the 2003 firefight when he was in Italian custody.

There was concern over Harun's sanity, but experts in mental health testified that he had the basic mental competency to stand trial.
Nevertheless, he is reported to have insisted he was a "warrior", and tried to insist he should be tried in the Guantanamo military commission system.  He is reported to have refused to appear in court or discuss his case with his lawyers, because he was not being tried in Guantanamo.

His trial lasted two weeks, but it only took his jury two hours to reach their verdict. He was sentenced to life in prison in 2018. As of 2023, Harun is serving his life sentence at ADX Florence, a federal supermax prison in Florence, Colorado. 

Law Professor Karen Greenberg, the author of several books on Guantanamo, described Harun's case as significant, as it showed how trials in civilian courts could be successful, in contrast to the long delays, and confusion, when suspects were tried, in Guantanamo military commissions.

References

1971 births
Living people
Prisoners sentenced to life imprisonment by the United States federal government
People convicted of murder by the United States federal government
People extradited to the United States
Inmates of ADX Florence
Nigerian criminals